This is a list of all the players who have captained the Gibraltar national football team since its full UEFA membership in May 2013.

Roy Chipolina is the first captain of the Gibraltar national football team. He wore the captain band the most times (62), and is the current captain of the national team.

List of captains

List of captaincy periods of the various captains throughout the years.

Players in bold are still active. Years in italics indicate last year, when still an active player was a captain.

References

Captain
Gibraltar captains
Association football player non-biographical articles